The Afon Gwydderig is a tributary of the Afon Brân. It rises as the Nant Gwydderig on the southern slopes of Mynydd Bwlch-y-groes, about  North of the small village of Llywel, Powys. The A40 runs next to the river from Llywel as far as Llandovery, Carmarthenshire.

The Gwydderig crosses the boundary between Powys and Carmarthenshire at the village of Halfway. The Gwydderig therefore forms part of the Towy's catchment basin and drains into the Bristol Channel at the Towy estuary.

Rivers of the Brecon Beacons National Park
Rivers of Carmarthenshire
Rivers of Powys